Karl-Erick Björk is a Swedish sprint canoer who competed in the early 1950s. He won two medals at the 1950 ICF Canoe Sprint World Championships in Copenhagen with a silver in the K-4 10000 m and a bronze in the K-2 10000 m events.

References

Living people
Swedish male canoeists
Year of birth missing (living people)
ICF Canoe Sprint World Championships medalists in kayak